Eupithecia sogai is a species of moth of the family Geometridae described by Claude Herbulot in 1970. It is found in North Madagascar.

It looks similar to Eupithecia personata, D. S. Fletcher, and the length of its front wings is 11.5 mm.

References

sogai
Moths described in 1970
Moths of Madagascar